The Ilić Ilindenka was a series of Yugoslavian standard class sailplanes capable of aerobatics.

Design
The single seat, standard class span) Ilindenka was, like most of its contemporaries, an all-wood sailplane. It had a cantilever, twin spar, shoulder wing with plywood skin around its leading edge ahead of the forward spar. The wing was trapezoidal in plan, with taper on both edges, and set with 2.5° of dihedral. Ailerons occupied about half the trailing edges and Schemp-Hirth type spoilers were mounted at 40% chord. Each wing was braced by a thin strut between rear spar and lower fuselage.

The Ilindenka had an oval section, ply-skinned forward fuselage, becoming more rectangular aft. Its cockpit was at the wing leading edge, under a single piece canopy with a fairing behind it which fell away into the upper rear fuselage. Its tall fin was rounded in profile, with a  horn balanced rudder of similar area. Its tailplane was mounted well forward on the fin just above the fuselage and carried elevators of similar area to it.

It landed on a skid under the forward fuselage.

Variants
Ilindenka 1
Ilindenka 1T
Ilindenka 2

Operational history
The Iindenka first flew in 1953 and was certified to fly loops, rolls and spins. Production numbers are not known but the Airforce Museum in Belgrade holds two examples, though neither was on display in 2009. Photographs show another, earlier example and one with a later registration identified as an Ilindenka 2. Externally, the latter shows little difference from the Ilindenka 1 but there is little information on this variant.

One Illindenka, flown by Zvonimir Rain, was Yugoslavia's sole Standard Class contestant at the 1958 World Soaring Championships, held in California. It was placed 12th out of 24.

Specifications (Ilindenka 1)

References

Aircraft first flown in 1953
1950s Yugoslav sailplanes